Coração de Gaúcho is a 1920 Brazilian silent drama film directed by and starring Luiz de Barros. The film is based on the novel O gaúcho by José de Alencar.

The film premiered on 26 April 1920 in Rio de Janeiro and stars Manuel F. Araujo and António Silva.

Cast
Manuel F. Araujo  
Luiz de Barros   
Antônia Denegri   
Alvaro Fonseca   
Cândida Leal   
António Silva

External links
 

1920 drama films
1920 films
Brazilian black-and-white films
Brazilian silent films
Films directed by Luiz de Barros
Films based on Brazilian novels
Brazilian drama films
Silent drama films